Life and Death in Flanders is a 1963 Belgian drama film directed by Emile Degelin. It was entered into the 13th Berlin International Film Festival.

Cast
 Alice De Groeve as Moeder
 Maurits De Roeck as Jan Boele
 Simone De Wit as Smaak
 Elisabeth Dulac as Ogen
 Dolf Tilleman as Nand
 Veerle Van Laere as Jonge Wanne
 Mathilde Van Mol as Wanne
 Denise Wouters as Tale Siepers

References

External links

1963 films
1960s Dutch-language films
1963 drama films
Belgian black-and-white films
Films directed by Emile Degelin
Films set in Flanders
Belgian drama films